Magele Sekati Fiaui (born ~1985) is a Samoan politician and Member of the Legislative Assembly of Samoa. He is a member of the FAST Party.

Magele is from the village of Iva Savaii. He was first elected to the Legislative Assembly of Samoa in the 2021 Samoan general election, becoming the youngest member of parliament. An election petition against him was unsuccessful. On 28 July 2021 he was appointed Associate Minister of Communications Information and Technology.

References

Living people
Members of the Legislative Assembly of Samoa
Faʻatuatua i le Atua Samoa ua Tasi politicians
People from Savai'i
Year of birth missing (living people)